Acritogramma is a genus of moths in the family Erebidae.

Species
Acritogramma metaleuca (Hampson, 1913)
Acritogramma noctar (Schaus, 1901)

References
Natural History Museum Lepidoptera genus database

Omopterini
Noctuoidea genera